K. C. Constantine (a pseudonym for Carl Constantine Kosak; born 1934 in McKees Rocks, Pennsylvania) is an American mystery author.

Little is known about Kosak, as he prefers anonymity and has given only a few interviews. He was born in 1934 and served in the Marines in the early 1950s. He lives in Greensburg, Pennsylvania with wife Linda.

He is an alumnus of Westminster College in New Wilmington, Pennsylvania and claims that he "flunked freshman composition twice" because he "did not know how to make an English sentence." (As reported in the bulletin of that college's "Friends of the Library" Autumn, 1990.)

Other than that, information is sketchy. He may have been a minor league baseball player (some had even been suggesting that Kosak was a pseudonym for former Major League baseball player Phil Rizzuto) and he may have studied at the University of Iowa's writers' program in the 1960s. Other evidence suggests he never got near a baseball and instead was a journalist at a western Pennsylvania newspaper.

Kosak continued to work a day job until 1993, when he lost his job and turned to writing full-time. He worked for several years as an English teacher at Seton Hill University (then Seton Hill College) in Greensburg, where he taught creative writing and composition, until his refusal to complete his master's degree prompted his dismissal.

His most famous creation is Mario Balzic, police chief in fictional Rocksburg, Pennsylvania. Rocksburg is a by-product of Kosak's hometown McKees Rocks, Pennsylvania as well as the cities of Greensburg, Pennsylvania and Johnstown, Pennsylvania. Kosak is much more interested in the people in his novels than the actual mystery, and his later novels become ever more philosophical, threatening to leave the mystery/detective genre behind completely.

In May 2011, Kosak appeared in person for the first time at the 16th annual Festival of Mystery held at the Greek Orthodox Church in Oakmont, signing his books and giving a live interview.

General references
Reclusive author K.C. Constantine reveals himself at 2011 mystery fest

External links
 KC Constantine's page at BadAttitudes.com Includes an interview and the first chapter of Upon Some Midnights Clear

1934 births
Living people
Seton Hill University
American mystery writers
20th-century American novelists
People from Greensburg, Pennsylvania
United States Marines
21st-century American novelists
American male novelists
20th-century American male writers
21st-century American male writers
Novelists from Pennsylvania